Edward James Bishop (born 15 July 1996) is an English professional footballer who plays as a midfielder for  club Lincoln City.

Club career

Ipswich Town
Bishop was born in Cambridge, Cambridgeshire. He originally played for boyhood side Whittlesford Warriors before starting his career as part of the Ipswich Town academy system with the under-8s. He signed his first professional contract with Ipswich in May 2014, signing a one-year contract. On 12 August 2014, Bishop made his first-team debut for Ipswich Town in the first round of the League Cup against Crawley Town. He came on as a 77th-minute substitute for Kévin Bru in a match which Ipswich Town lost 1–0 after extra-time. On 30 August 2014, Bishop made his league debut in a 1–1 draw against Derby County. On 11 September 2014, Bishop signed a two-year extension to his Ipswich Town contract. Bishop became a regular in the Ipswich Town team, attracting praise from his manager Mick McCarthy, as well as former Ipswich Town player Mick Mills. Bishop scored his first goal for Ipswich against Bournemouth in a 2–2 draw on 22 November. In February 2015, Bishop signed a new contract with Ipswich, signing a three-year deal with the option of an additional year extension. He scored once and provided seven assists in 36 appearances during his first senior season, helping Ipswich reach the Championship play-offs.

Bishop suffered a shin splint injury in the build-up to the 2015–16 season and then a hamstring injury when he was edging close to a first-team return. On 6 January 2016 manager Mick McCarthy said of the promising midfielder "It's really difficult for him, it's really difficult for Bish as a young kid because he wants to be playing and footballers are never happy except when they're playing. You get in a bit of a low when you're injured for such a long time and you can't see an end to it. However, when he returns, it will be fantastic." Bishop did not make an appearance until the 5 April when he came off the bench in 0–0 draw with Charlton Athletic. He made 4 appearances during the remainder of the season, assisting the winning goal in a 0–1 away win over Derby County on the final day of the season.

He started the opening game of the 2016–17 season in a 4–2 home win against Barnsley at Portman Road. Bishop continued to feature regularly during the first half of the season. He suffered an ankle ligament injury in December, ruling him out of action for up to four weeks. He returned to the first-team on 4 February, featuring as a substitute in a 2–2 draw with Reading. He made 20 appearances during the 2016–17 season.

Bishop again struggled for fitness during the 2017–18 season. He made his first appearance of the season as a substitute in a 0–2 away loss to Aston Villa on 25 November. He only played four times during the first half of the season, before rupturing his hamstring in a match against Queens Park Rangers on Boxing Day, ruling him out of action for the rest of the season. In April 2018, Ipswich took up the option to extend Bishop's contract by a further year.

After recovering from the hamstring injury suffered in December 2017, Bishop made his return to the first-team as a substitute in a EFL Cup tie against Exeter City on 14 August. He did not make a league appearance until 23 November, when he featured as a second-half substitute in a 1–2 loss to West Bromwich Albion. On 9 February 2019, Bishop signed a new two-year contract with Ipswich Town, keeping him at the club until 2021, with the option of a further year. He managed to feature more regularly during the 2018–19 season, making 20 appearances in all competitions, 13 of which were starts, the most starts Bishop had managed since his debut season in 2014–15.

Bishop suffered a knee injury during the 2019 pre-season, ruling him out of action for three months. He did not feature in the league until New Year's Day 2020 when he came off the bench in a 1–1 draw with Wycombe Wanderers. He made 10 appearances during the remainder of the 2019–20 season, before it was suspended due to the outbreak of the COVID-19 pandemic.

He started in the opening match of the 2020–21 season in an EFL Cup first round tie against Bristol Rovers, assisting Freddie Sears' second goal as Ipswich won 3–0. Bishop scored his first goal since November 2014 in the first league match of the season, netting the opening goal in a 2–0 home win against Wigan Athletic at Portman Road. He made his 100th appearance for Ipswich in a 1–1 draw with Milton Keynes Dons on 3 October. His goal scoring form continued during the early stages of the season, scoring 4 goals and providing two assists in the opening 14 games of the season, including scoring a late winner with a long range shot from outside the box in a 1–0 home win over Gillingham on 27 October. On 21 November, Bishop picked up an ankle injury in a match against Shrewsbury Town, ruling him out for a few weeks. He returned from injury on 16 January 2021, making his 100th league appearance for Ipswich in a 1–0 away win against Burton Albion.

On 10 May 2021, Ipswich announced that Bishop had triggered a clause to extend his contract by an additional year, keeping him under contract until 2022.

Lincoln City
On 27 July 2021, Bishop joined Lincoln City for an undisclosed fee. This ended his 17-year association with Ipswich. He would make his Lincoln City debut coming off the bench on the opening day of the season against Gillingham. He would make his first start against Shrewsbury Town in the EFL Cup a few days later, where he would score his first goal for the club, a stunning goal from outside the area.

International career
On 17 March 2015, Bishop received his first call-up for England at youth level after being named in the England U19 squad for the elite round of European Under-19 Championship qualifiers. However, he withdrew from the squad due to injury.

Career statistics

Honours
Individual
Ipswich Town Young Player of the Year: 2014–15

References

External links

Profile at the Ipswich Town F.C. website

1996 births
Living people
Sportspeople from Cambridge
English footballers
Association football midfielders
Ipswich Town F.C. players
Lincoln City F.C. players
English Football League players